Logie may refer to:

Places in Scotland
Logie, Dundee, a residential area in the City of Dundee
Logie, Fife, a village and parish of east Fife
Logie Coldstone, an Aberdeenshire village north of the River Dee

People

By surname
George Logie-Smith (1914–2007), an Australian conductor, music examiner, and music educator
Gus Logie (born 1960), a Trinidad and Tobago cricketer and former wicketkeeper for the West Indies cricket team
John H. Logie, Mayor of Grand Rapids, Michigan from 1992 to 2003
Jimmy Logie (1919–1984), Scottish footballer
Willie Logie (1932–2016), Scottish footballer
Willy Logie, a retired Belgian professional darts player
W. S. Loggie

By given name
James Logie Robertson (1846–1922), a literary scholar, editor and author, who also used the pen name Hugh Haliburton
John Logie Baird, the inventor of television
Logie Bruce Lockhart (1921–2020), a British writer and journalist, formerly a Scottish rugby union player and headmaster of Gresham's School
Thomas Logie MacDonald (1901–1973), Scottish astronomer and politician and eponym of lunar crater McDonald

Other uses
Logie Awards, the Australian television industry awards
"The Laird O Logie", children's ballad
Logie, a House in Wallace High School, Stirling

See also
-logy